Governor Legge may refer to:

George Legge, 1st Baron Dartmouth (1640s–1691), Governor of Portsmouth in 1673
Francis Legge (1719–1783), Governor of Nova Scotia from 1772 to 1776